Mark W. Hyland (born September 26, 1887) was an American football player and coach. He served as the head football coach at Grinnell College in Grinnell, Iowa from 1924 to 1926, compiling a record of 12–7–3. Hyland played college football at the University of Iowa, lettering from 1908 to 1910.

References

1887 births
Year of death missing
Grinnell Pioneers football coaches
Iowa Hawkeyes football players
Players of American football from Des Moines, Iowa